Selbu is a municipality in Trøndelag county, Norway. The administrative centre of the municipality is the village of Mebonden. Other villages in Selbu include Flora, Fossan, Hyttbakken, Innbygda, Selbustrand, Trøa, Tømra, and Vikvarvet.

The  municipality is the 86th largest by area out of the 356 municipalities in Norway. Selbu is the 200th most populous municipality in Norway with a population of 4,090.

General information

The municipality (originally the parish) of Selbu was established on 1 January 1838 (see Formannskapsdistrikt law). On 1 January 1901, the eastern part of the municipality was separated to form the new municipality of Tydal. This left Selbu with 4,607 inhabitants. The borders of Selbu have not changed since that date.

On 1 January 2018, the municipality switched from the old Sør-Trøndelag county to the new Trøndelag county.

Name
The municipality (originally the parish) is named "Selbu" after a nearby lake since the first Selbu Church was built near its southeastern shore. The first element is the genitive case of the old name of the lake Selbusjøen. The old name of the lake is probably derived from the word  which means "harness" since the lake is long and narrow.

Coat of arms
The coat of arms was granted on 31 May 1991. The official blazon is "Argent, 24 lozenges sable in three rosettes two over one". This means the arms have a field (background) has a tincture of argent which means it is commonly colored white, but if it is made out of metal, then silver is used. The charge is a three selburoses made out of 8 rhombus shapes each. The selburose design is a typical pattern used in the local lusekofte (traditional Norwegian sweaters) and other woollen garments. Home knitting has been a long tradition in the municipality. The arms were designed by John Digernes. The municipal flag has the same design as the coat of arms.

Churches
The Church of Norway has one parish within the municipality of Selbu. It is part of the Stjørdal prosti (deanery) in the Diocese of Nidaros.

Economy

Traditionally, Selbu has been an agricultural and forest managing community. The area is well known for its special knitting techniques. The last decades have led to efforts in business such as high technology, electronics, and mechanics. The newspaper Selbyggen has been published in Selbu since 1889.

Government
All municipalities in Norway, including Selbu, are responsible for primary education (through 10th grade), outpatient health services, senior citizen services, unemployment and other social services, zoning, economic development, and municipal roads. The municipality is governed by a municipal council of elected representatives, which in turn elect a mayor.  The municipality falls under the Trøndelag District Court and the Frostating Court of Appeal.

Municipal council
The municipal council of Selbu is made up of 25 representatives that are elected to four year terms. The party breakdown of the council is as follows:

Mayors
The mayors of Selbu:

1838–1845: Hans E. Sandborg
1845–1847: Ole I. Sesseng
1848–1855: Hans Henrik Emil Tybring
1856–1873: Ingebrigt Norbye
1873-1873: Agathon Bartholomæus Hansteen
1874–1893: Ingebrigt Flønæs (H)
1894–1898: John Klegseth (V)
1899–1916: Ole O. Henmo (V)
1917–1922: Peder Johannes Norbye (V)
1923–1925: Ole H. Kjøsnes (Ap)
1926–1928: Arnt Kvello (Bp)
1929–1940: Ole H. Kjøsnes (Ap)
1941-1941: P.P. Evjen (Bp)
1941–1945: Martin Hofsli (NS)
1945–1963: Johan Berge (Ap)
1964–1975: Olav N. Overvik (Ap)
1976–1983: Halvard Kulseth (Sp)
1984–1987: Albert Uglem (Ap)
1988–1995: Helga Renå (Ap)
1995–1999: Torbjørn Olsen (Ap)
1999–2003: Kjell Mebust (KrF)
2003–2007: Karin Galaaen (Sp)
2007–2015: Inga Balstad (Ap)
2015–present: Ole Morten Balstad (Ap)

Geography

Selbu borders nine municipalities. The municipalities of Trondheim, Malvik, and Stjørdal are to the north; Meråker and Tydal are to the east; Tydal, Holtålen, and Midtre Gauldal are to the south; and Melhus and Klæbu are to the west.

Another lake in the municipality is Sørungen. The Nea River and Rotla River both flow through the municipality.

Climate
Located inland in the Trøndelag region at relatively low altitude, Selbu has a humid continental climate (Dfb), but with a relatively mild winter for this climate type, as the sea is not that far away. The all-time low  was recorded Februar 2010 and January record low is also from 2010, all the other record lows are from 1983 or older. The all-time high  is from June 2020. Recent decades have tended to be warmer than earlier decades; 8 of the 12 record highs are from after 2010.

Transportation
The main road through Selbu is Norwegian County Road 705 that runs between Stjørdal, Selbu, and Tydal. Selbu is located near important destinations:

Notable people 

 Marit Guldsetbrua Emstad (born 1841 in Selbu) popularized the Selburose knitting design in 1857 when she knitted three pairs of mittens with an eight-petalled rose design
 Belle Gunness (1859 in Selbu – ca.1908) a Norwegian-American serial killer, active in Illinois and Indiana between 1884 and 1908, thought to have killed at least fourteen people
 Peder Morset (1887 in Selbu – 1943) a teacher and Norwegian resistance member
 Per Almaas (1898 in Selbu – 1991) a teacher and politician; Mayor of Strinda municipality council pre and post WWII
 Inga Balstad (born 1952 in Selbu) a Norwegian politician, Mayor of Selbu since 2007

Sport 
 Hans Olav Sørensen (born 1942 in Selbu) a Norwegian former ski jumper who competed at the 1964 Winter Olympics
 Brit Stav (born 1944 in Selbu) a Norwegian archer, competed at the 1972 Summer Olympics
 Malin Aune (born 1995 in Selbu) a handball player for the Norway women's national handball team

References

External links

Municipal fact sheet from Statistics Norway 
Aerial photography from Selbu
Selbuvott

 
Municipalities of Trøndelag
1838 establishments in Norway